Acidocerus aphodioides is a species of water scavenger beetle in the family Hydrophilidae. It is the only species in the genus Acidocerus. It is known only from Mozambique.

Taxonomy 
The genus Acidocerus was described for the first time by Klug in 1855, containing only one species. It is the genus that is the basis of the name for the subfamily Acidocerinae.

Description 
A diagnosis was presented by Girón and Short:

Some of these diagnostic features were offered by d'Orchymont in a key.

References

Hydrophilinae